Hamdi Braa (born 7 September 1986) is a Tunisian basketball player for Stade Nabeulien in the Championnat National A. Braa has played professionally since 2004. He helped the club to the 2007 Tunisian Championship.

Braa is a member of the Tunisia national basketball team that finished third at the 2009 FIBA Africa Championship to qualify for the country's first FIBA World Championship.  Braa averaged 5 PPG and 3.6 RPG for the Tunisians during the tournament.  He also competed for the Tunisians in the 2007 FIBA Africa Championship.

References

External links
 Afrobasket.com profile

1986 births
Living people
2010 FIBA World Championship players
Centers (basketball)
JS Kairouan basketball players
Étoile Sportive du Sahel basketball players
Gezira basketball players
Power forwards (basketball)
Stade Nabeulien basketball players
Tunisian expatriate basketball people in Egypt
Tunisian expatriate basketball people in Saudi Arabia
Tunisian men's basketball players